Fear the Worst is a novel written by Canadian author Linwood Barclay.

References

Novels by Linwood Barclay
2009 Canadian novels